Daniel P. Evans (born January 27, 1960) is an American professional baseball executive. Within Major League Baseball, Evans was most recently a scout for the Toronto Blue Jays. He is currently a member of the Baseball Prospectus Advisory Board, serves on the board of directors for the Society of American Baseball Research (SABR) and is President of SABR's Rocky Mountain Chapter. Evans attended Lane Technical High School on Chicago's North Side and DePaul University.

He started in baseball as an intern with the Chicago White Sox while a junior at DePaul University and was eventually promoted to Assistant General Manager. After almost 20 years, Evans resigned from the White Sox following the 2000 season. During his tenure, he was responsible for drafting or acquiring future Hall of Famer Frank Thomas, Tom Seaver, Robin Ventura, Paul Konerko, and Bo Jackson, among others. Evans then became the Executive Vice President and General Manager of the Los Angeles Dodgers from 2001 to 2004 during which they ended a seven-year postseason drought. Among the players drafted under Evans were all-stars Matt Kemp and Russell Martin. While Dodgers' GM, Evans promoted the first Taiwanese player (Chin-Feng Chen) to the Major Leagues. Evans was later responsible for the Pacific Rim Operations of the Toronto Blue Jays and also scouted Major League and minor league players.

He was Commissioner of the Northern League of Professional Baseball in 2013, which folded before playing games due to the league's ownership issues. Evans authored a column "108 Stitches" for Baseball Prospectus before working for the Blue Jays. In 2013, he also became an instructor for the online sports-career training school Sports Management Worldwide.

Evans' Twitter account, @DanEvans108, was honored as a "Top 100 Must-Follow Sports Business Twitter Account of 2014" by Forbes and has also been named among the "Top 50 Baseball Related Twitter Accounts" by Baseball America.

Evans was born in Chicago, Illinois. He has two daughters and lives in Boulder, Colorado.

References

Major League Baseball executives
Living people
Los Angeles Dodgers executives
Seattle Mariners scouts
Toronto Blue Jays scouts
Major League Baseball general managers
DePaul University alumni
1960 births
Sportspeople from Chicago